Mark Manning Flanagan (born 30 May 1990) is an Australian professional boxer.

Professional boxing career
Flanagan won the Australian cruiserweight title with a points decision at the Townsville Entertainment and Convention Centre. Flanagan made his first defence against Quinn. Flanagan has won six more bouts, challenging Denis Lebedev for the WBA (Super) cruiserweight title. Denis Lebedev won by unanimous decision.

Professional boxing record

References

External links

Living people
Sportspeople from Townsville
Sportsmen from Queensland
Australian male boxers
Cruiserweight boxers
Light-heavyweight boxers
1990 births
21st-century Australian people